Vacuolar protein sorting-associated protein 52 homolog is a protein that in humans is encoded by the VPS52 gene.

This gene encodes a protein that is similar to the yeast suppressor of actin mutations 2 gene. The yeast protein forms a subunit of the tetrameric Golgi-associated retrograde protein complex that is involved in vesicle trafficking from both early and late endosomes, back to the trans-Golgi network. This gene is located on chromosome 6 in a head-to-head orientation with the gene encoding ribosomal protein S18.

References

Further reading